Sergei Nikolaievich Winogradsky  (or Vinohradsky; published under the name of Sergius Winogradsky  or M. S. Winogradsky  ; 1 September 1856 – 25 February 1953) was an Ukrainian microbiologist, ecologist and soil scientist who pioneered the cycle-of-life concept. Winogradsky discovered the first known form of lithotrophy during his research with Beggiatoa in 1887.  He reported that Beggiatoa oxidized hydrogen sulfide (H2S) as an energy source and formed intracellular sulfur droplets. This research provided the first example of lithotrophy, but not autotrophy.

His research on nitrifying bacteria would report the first known form of chemoautotrophy, showing how a lithotroph fixes carbon dioxide (CO2) to make organic compounds.

He is best known in school science as the inventor of the Winogradsky Column technique for the study of sediment microbes.

Biography
Winogradsky was born in Kyiv (then in the Russian Empire) to a family of wealthy lawyers. Among his paternal ancestors were Cossack atamans or hetmans (in Ukrainian), and on the maternal side - the hetman family Skoropadsky. In this early stage of his life, Winogradsky was "strictly devoted to the orthodox faith", though he later became irreligious.

After graduating from the 2nd Kyiv Gymnasium in 1873, he began studying law, but he entered the Imperial Conservatoire of Music in St Petersburg in 1875 to study piano. However, after two years of music training, he entered the University of Saint Petersburg in 1877 to study chemistry under Nikolai Menshutkin and botany under Andrei Sergeevich Famintzin.

He received a diploma in 1881 and stayed at the St. Petersburg University for a degree of Master of Science in botany in 1884. In 1885, he began work at the University of Strasbourg under the renowned botanist Anton de Bary; Winogradsky became renowned for his work on sulfur bacteria.

In 1888, he relocated to Zurich, where he began investigation into the process of nitrification, identifying the genera Nitrosomonas and Nitrosococcus, which oxidizes ammonium to nitrite, and Nitrobacter, which oxidizes nitrite to nitrate.

He returned to St. Petersburg for the period 1891–1905, and headed the division of general microbiology of the Institute of Experimental Medicine. During this period, he identified the obligate anaerobe Clostridium pasteurianum, which is capable of fixing atmospheric nitrogen. In St. Petersburg, he trained his only student and assistant Vasily Omelianski which popularized Winogradskys concepts and methodology in the Soviet Union during the next decades.

In 1901, he was elected an honorary member of the Moscow Society of Naturalists and, in 1902, a corresponding member of the French Academy of Sciences. In 1905, due to ill health, the scientist left the institute and moved from St. Petersburg to the town of Horodok in Podolia, where from 1892 he owned a huge estate. In fact, while working as the director of the Institute of Experimental Medicine, Vynohradsky renounced his salary, which was transferred to a special account, and then used these funds to build a room for a scientific library, the director of which lived on the income from the estate, where agricultural work was carried out.

In Gorodok Vynohradsky addressed the problems of agriculture and soil science. He introduced new management methods, bought the best varieties of seeds, plants, and livestock, and advanced technology. As a businessman and businessman, he achieved unprecedented success. His estate became one of the richest and most successful in Podolia, and remained profitable even during the First World War, falling under Austro-Hungarian occupation.

He retired from active scientific work in 1905, dividing his time between his private estate in Horodok, Podalia and Switzerland. 
After the revolution of 1917, Vinogradsky went first to Switzerland and then to Belgrade. In 1922, he accepted an invitation to head the division of agricultural bacteriology at the Pasteur Institute at an experimental station at Brie-Comte-Robert, France, about 30 km from Paris. During this period, he worked on a number of topics, among them iron bacteria, nitrifying bacteria, nitrogen fixation by Azotobacter, cellulose-decomposing bacteria, and culture methods for soil microorganisms. Winogradsky retired from active life in 1940 and died in Brie-Comte-Robert in 1953.

Discoveries
Winogradsky discovered various biogeochemical cycles and parts of these cycles. These discoveries include
 His work on bacterial sulfide oxidation for which he first became renowned, including the first known form of lithotrophy (in Beggiatoa).
 His work on the Nitrogen cycle including
 The identification of the obligate anaerobe Clostridium pasteurianum is a free living microbe capable of fixing atmospheric nitrogen and not living in legume root nodules.
 Chemosynthesis – his most noted discovery
 The Winogradsky column

Chemosynthesis
Winogradsky is best known for discovering chemoautotrophy, which soon became popularly known as chemosynthesis, the process by which organisms derive energy from a number of different inorganic compounds and obtain carbon in the form of carbon dioxide. Previously, it was believed that autotrophs obtained their energy solely from light, not from reactions of inorganic compounds.  With the discovery of organisms that oxidized inorganic compounds such as hydrogen sulfide and ammonium as energy sources, autotrophs could be divided into two groups: photoautotrophs and chemoautotrophs.  Winogradsky was one of the first researchers to attempt to understand microorganisms outside of the medical context, making him among the first students of microbial ecology and environmental microbiology.

The Winogradsky column remains an important display of chemoautotrophy and microbial ecology, demonstrated in microbiology lectures around the world.

See also
 Hermann Hellriegel
 Martinus Beijerinck

Memorials

A school, was named after him in Vynohrad, Ivano-Frankivsk Oblast, Ukraine.

In 2012, a monument to the scientist was erected in Horodok, Khmelnytskyi Oblast, Ukraine.

Study of the life and activity 
Professional study and popularization of the life, activities, personality of the scientist Sergey Winogradsky is held on the international social and communication platform Winogradsky Club. The Winogradsky Club center is located in the Horodok Khmelnytskyi Oblast, Ukraine, in the modern hi-tech museum G-Museum, which is a reconstruction of the Horodok Museum of Local History. Sergey Winogradsky was the last owner of the estate Horodok and lived there from 1905 to 1916, engaged in innovative agricultural and entrepreneurial activities, which led to a rise in the standard of living in Horodok. There is an exhibition in the G-Museum - a copy of the laboratory of Sergey Winogradsky  in Brie-Comte-Robert (France) with the world's only wax figure of the great scientist.

Further reading

Ackert, Lloyd. Sergei Vinogradskii and the Cycle of Life: From the Thermodynamics of Life to Ecological Microbiology, 1850-1950. Vol. 34.; Dordrecht; London: Springer, 2013.

References

External links
 Sergei Winogradsky at Cycle of Life website including images.
 Bust of Winogradsky in Gorodok
 page Winogradsky Club 
 official website G-Museum 

1856 births
1953 deaths
Environmental microbiology
Foreign Members of the Royal Society
Former Russian Orthodox Christians
Nitrogen cycle
Ukrainian biochemists
Ukrainian microbiologists
Ukrainian biologists
Ukrainian ecologists
Leeuwenhoek Medal winners
Academic staff of the University of Strasbourg